The 1940 United States presidential election in Delaware took place on November 5, 1940, as part of the 1940 United States presidential election. Delaware voters chose three representatives, or electors, to the Electoral College, who voted for president and vice president.

Delaware was won by incumbent President Franklin D. Roosevelt (D–New York), running with Secretary Henry A. Wallace, with 54.70% of the popular vote, against Wendell Willkie (R–New York), running with Minority Leader Charles L. McNary, with 45.05% of the popular vote.

Results

See also
 United States presidential elections in Delaware

References

Delaware
1940
1940 Delaware elections